Distant Drummer is a studio album by American hip hop producer Omid. It was released by Beneath the Surface on February 19, 2002. It draws inspiration from the music of Sun Ra, as well as a science fiction book Hyperion. The tracks from the album appeared on Logic 12, a Logic Skateboard Media video, in 2002.

Critical reception

Writing for XLR8R, DJ Anna said: "While the songs don't always achieve the depth or scope of, dare I say, a DJ Shadow piece, they do exist as lovely and moving soundscapes, and Omid proves himself to be a technically awesome electronic composer."

The album reached number 3 on CMJ's "Hip-Hop" chart, as well as number 21 on KUCI's "Top 30" chart. Fritz the Cat of Vice included it on the "Top Nine" list in December 2003.

Track listing

Personnel
Credits adapted from liner notes.

 Omid Walizadeh – production, mixing
 Leila – cello (9)
 Nikko – vocals (11)
 DJ Drez – turntables (11)
 Damon Tedesco – mastering
 Kevin Ramos – photography
 Sid M. Dueñas – design

References

External links
 

2002 albums
Omid Walizadeh albums
Instrumental hip hop albums